Alana Quade ( Boyd, born 10 May 1984) is a former Australian pole vaulter and Olympian.

Athletic career 
The 2008 Australian Champion, Boyd was selected for the 2007 World Championships, but did not make the final. She did not make the final at the 2008 Summer Olympics, but did at the 2012 Summer Olympics, where she finished in 11th place. Boyd won the gold medal for the women's pole vault at the 2010 Commonwealth Games in Delhi, which she retained at the 2014 Commonwealth Games in Glasgow. She also reached the final of the 2012 Indoor World Championships, finishing in 9th.

Her personal best jump of 4.81 metres, achieved in July 2016 on the Sunshine Coast, was an Australian record at the time.

Personal life
Boyd married Ryan Quade on 24 September 2016, with whom she has two children.

Boyd's parents are both former Australian Olympians and her participation in the 2008 Beijing Olympics marked the first time a child of two former Olympians competed in an Australian Olympic team. Her mother Denise (née Robertson) won the gold medal for 200 metres at the 1978 Commonwealth Games in Edmonton and ran in three Olympic finals. Her father and coach Ray Boyd was also a Commonwealth Games champion and double-Olympic pole vaulter. Alana has two siblings, who have also represented Australia internationally: Jacinta, a 6.64-metre long jumper, and Matt, a 5.35-metre pole vaulter.

References

External links
 
 
 
 
 
 

1984 births
Living people
Australian female pole vaulters
Olympic athletes of Australia
Athletes (track and field) at the 2008 Summer Olympics
Athletes (track and field) at the 2012 Summer Olympics
Athletes (track and field) at the 2016 Summer Olympics
Athletes (track and field) at the 2010 Commonwealth Games
Commonwealth Games gold medallists for Australia
Sportswomen from Victoria (Australia)
World Athletics Championships athletes for Australia
Athletes (track and field) at the 2014 Commonwealth Games
Commonwealth Games medallists in athletics
Athletes from Melbourne
20th-century Australian women
21st-century Australian women
Medallists at the 2010 Commonwealth Games
Medallists at the 2014 Commonwealth Games